Tatyos Ekserciyan (1858 – March 16, 1913), or Tatyos Efendi, was a famous composer of classical Turkish music, and his works continue to be among the most played and revered examples of the genre.

An Armenian from Istanbul, Tatyos Efendi was born in 1858 in the Ortaköy district of Istanbul as the son of Manug Aga, an amateur musician at the Ortaköy Armenian Church. Tatyos Efendi's family had a minor trading business and when he finished the Ortaköy Armenian Elementary School, he started an apprenticeship at a locksmith and later became an apprentice at a savat workshop (a traditional form of silver work). Due to his deep interest in music, Tatyos Efendi left his apprenticeship and bought a second hand kanun to receive his first music lessons from his uncle Movses Papazyan. He played the kanun with amateur groups and musical meetings in a family setting. Later, he took violin lessons from Kemani Kör Sebuh and lessons in singing and theory from Andon and Civan brothers and singer Asdik Aga. He conducted many fasıl concerts in various places including the Pirincci Gazino with artists like Karakaş, Ovakim and Şemsi. He composed many popular songs and instrumental works for fasıl.

Tatyos Efendi co-performed with many famous musicians of his time like Ahmed Rasim Bey, Civan and Andon brothers, Şevki Bey, Kemenceci Vasilaki and Tanburi Cemil Bey. His successful instrumental works show the influence of these co-performances. A poet as well as a composer, he often wrote the lyrics of most of his works. Tatyos Efendi's compositions successfully reflect the traditional aspects of the melodic forms and are a testimony to his superior understanding of the structure of Turkish classical music. The musicians that learned from him include Arşak Çömlekçiyan, Münir Mazhar Kamsoy, Nasibin Mehmet Yürü, Mustafa Sunar and Abdülkadir Töre.

The composer spent his last years alone in misery. His health ailing due to too much alcohol, he was alone except for the company of a few dedicated friends like Ahmed Rasim Bey. He died of cirrhosis of the liver on March 16, 1913 and Ahmed Rasim Bey gathered a dozen or so friends for his funeral and had him buried in the Kadıköy Armenian cemetery.

Although especially famous for his command of musical notation and able to take down a tune to paper immediately at first hearing, many of Tatyos Efendi's works were not written down and were lost in time. His surviving works are the peşrevs in the Karcığar, Suznak, Rast makams (melodic form), the saz semais in the Hüseyni, Süznak, Rast makams and more than fifty songs in various makams.

Works
List of works by Tatyos Efendi:

Notes

References
 

1858 births
1913 deaths
Armenian composers
Armenians from the Ottoman Empire
Turkish classical composers
Musicians from Istanbul
Composers of Ottoman classical music
Composers from the Ottoman Empire
Composers of Turkish makam music
Male classical composers
Deaths from cirrhosis
Alcohol-related deaths in Turkey